Forrest Redlich is an Australian independent screenwriter/producer of films and TV, he has also worked as an editor and consultant of scripts, he is best known for creating and writing for  the TV serial E Street, which is produced in association with Bruce Best, through there company Westside Productions

Select Credit
High Rolling (1977) (feature film) - writer
 Sweet and Sour (TV series) - writer. 2eps.
A Country Practice (TV series) - writer, script editor, producer. 594 episodes. 1984-1988.
E Street (TV series) - creator, writer, executive producer. 404 episodes. 1989-1993.
Blue Heelers (TV series) - writer, story consultant. 100 episodes.
Wittekerke (Belgian TV series based on early episodes of E Street) - creator. 1067 episodes.
Westerdeich (German TV series based on E Street) - creator. 39 episodes.

References

High Rolling - Reviews.

External links

Australian screenwriters
Australian television producers
Living people
Place of birth missing (living people)
Year of birth missing (living people)